Steppin' On Water is a compilation album by Italian singer–songwriter Elisa. The compilation album was released on 21 February 2012 in Canada and on 13 March 2012 in the United States, Australia and Mexico.

Track listing

References

Elisa (Italian singer) albums
2012 albums